Bergen Street may refer to:
Bergen Street (IND Culver Line)
Bergen Street (IRT Eastern Parkway Line)
The Name (Bergen) Comes from a City In Norway